Hazel Virginia Hotchkiss Wightman, CBE (née Hotchkiss; December 20, 1886 – December 5, 1974) was an American tennis player and founder of the Wightman Cup, an annual team competition for British and American women. She dominated American women's tennis before World War I, and won 45 U.S. titles during her life.

Personal life
Wightman was born Hazel Virginia Hotchkiss in Healdsburg, California to William Joseph and Emma Lucretia (Grove) Hotchkiss. In February 1912, at the age of 25, she married George William Wightman of Boston. Her father-in-law, George Henry Wightman, was a leader in the steel industry, as an associate of Andrew Carnegie, and one of the country's foremost pioneers of amateur tennis.

She became a member of Kappa Kappa Gamma at the University of California, Berkeley and served as the chapter's president.

Wightman was the mother of five children. She died at her home in the village of Chestnut Hill, Massachusetts on December 5, 1974.

In 1973, Queen Elizabeth II made her an honorary Commander of the Order of the British Empire.

Career highlights
Wightman dominated American women's tennis before World War I and had an unparalleled reputation for sportsmanship. Wightman won a lifetime total of 45 U.S. titles, the last at age 68. She won 16 titles overall at the U.S. Championships, four of them in singles (1909–11, 1919). Nine of her titles at the U.S. Championships came from 1909 to 1911, when she swept the singles, women's doubles, and mixed doubles competitions three consecutive years.

Wightman is known as the "Queen Mother of American Tennis" or "Lady Tennis" for her lifelong participation in and promotion of women's tennis and because she was instrumental in organizing the Ladies International Tennis Challenge between British and American women's teams, better known as the Wightman Cup. The cup first was held in 1923 and continued through 1989. She played five years on the American team and was the captain of the American team from inception of the competition through 1948. The cup was composed of five singles and two doubles matches. The cup was donated in 1923 by Wightman in honor of her husband. The first contest at Forest Hills, New York on August 11 and 13, 1923 was won by the United States.

Born during the early days of American tennis, Wightman was a frail and awkward child. Her doctor recommended that she take up a sport to strengthen herself. Her brother suggested tennis as it was considered a "genteel" sport. Wightman learned to play at the nearby courts of the University of California, Berkeley where she graduated in 1911. Her rivalry with fellow Californian May Sutton shaped a new women's game, with Wightman attacking the net to counter Sutton's dominating forehand.

Wightman devoted herself to teaching young people, opening her home near Boston's Longwood Cricket Club to aspiring champions. In recognition of Wightman's contributions to tennis, the USTA Service Bowl was donated in her honor. In 1973, Wightman was appointed as an honorary Commander of the Order of the British Empire.

17 Grand Slam titles (4 singles, 7 women's doubles, 6 mixed doubles)
Won all three titles at the U.S. Championships: 1909–1911
Won singles title at the U.S. Championships: 1909–1911, 1919
Runner-up in singles at the U.S. Championships: 1915
Won women's doubles title at the U.S. Championships: 1909–1911, 1915, 1924, 1928
Runner-up in women's doubles at the U.S. Championships: 1919, 1923
Won mixed doubles title at the U.S. Championships: 1909–1911, 1915, 1918, 1920
Runner-up in mixed doubles at the U.S. Championships: 1926
Won women's doubles title at Wimbledon: 1924
Olympic gold medalist in women's doubles and mixed doubles: 1924
Won singles title at the U.S. Indoor Championships: 1919, 1927
Won women's doubles title at the U.S. Indoor Championships: 1919, 1921, 1924, 1927–1931, 1933, 1943
Runner-up in women's doubles at the U.S. Indoor Championships: 1923, 1926, 1932, 1941, 1946
Won mixed doubles title at the U.S. Indoor Championships: 1923, 1924, 1926–1928
Won doubles title at the U.S. Grass Court Championships (for age 40 and over): 1940–1942, 1944, 1946–1950, 1952, 1954
U.S. Wightman Cup team member: 1923, 1924, 1927, 1929, 1931
U.S. Wightman Cup team captain: 1923, 1924, 1927, 1929, 1931, 1933, 1935, 1937–1939, 1946–1948
Winner of USTA Service Bowl, donated in Wightman's honor: 1940, 1946
Author of Better Tennis
Coached several women champions, including Sarah Palfrey Cooke, Helen Wills Moody, and Helen Jacobs
Inducted into the International Tennis Hall of Fame in 1957
Appointed as an Honorary Commander of the Order of the British Empire by Queen Elizabeth II in 1973
Inducted into the International Women's Sports Hall of Fame in 1986
First honoree in the University of California women's athlete hall of fame

Career in depth

Though short in stature, Wightman anticipated and moved extremely well around a tennis court. She perfected her volleying style early, hitting the ball against the family home in Berkeley, California, where she grew up and graduated from the University of California. She refused to let the ball bounce because the yard was so uneven. She used to play against her four brothers and then the proud and spiky Sutton sisters.

Wightman was a shy, somewhat awed, and fascinated 22-year-old college girl when she arrived at the Philadelphia Cricket Club in 1909 for the U.S. Championships. She never before played on grass, but she used her attacking style and rock-ribbed volleying—she was the first woman to rely so heavily on the volley—to win the all-comers final over Louise Hammond 6–8, 6–1, 6–4 and then the title over 39-year-old Maud Barger-Wallach 6–0, 6–1. Wightman also won the women's doubles and mixed doubles titles that year.

In the 1910 Washington State Championships, Wightman won one of the few recorded "Golden Matches" in which the winner did not lose a point. She defeated a Miss Huiskamp (first name unknown).

Wightman successfully defended all three titles at the U.S. Championships in 1910 and 1911. Wightman easily defeated Hammond in the 1910 singles final. May Sutton, an old West Coast rival and singles titlist at the U.S. Championships in 1904, pushed Wightman hard in the 1911 singles final before Wightman prevailed 8–10, 6–4, 9–7.

The most remarkable comeback in Wightman's career came at the singles final of the 1911 Niagara International Tennis Tournament against Sutton. After losing the first set 0–6 and going down 1–5 in the second, she won 12 straight games and the title 0–6, 7–5, 6–0.

In 1912, Wightman married Bostonian George Wightman and did not defend her U.S. titles. However, responding to a challenge from her father to win after becoming a mother, which would be a U.S. first, she played again in 1915, losing the singles final to Molla Bjurstedt Mallory but winning the women's doubles and mixed doubles titles. At age 32, she won her fourth singles title with the loss of only one set, beating Marion Zinderstein 6–1, 6–2 in the final. She also reached the women's doubles final. Thereafter, her success (U.S. adult titles between 1909 and 1943) was limited to doubles.

Wightman envisioned a team tournament for women similar to the Davis Cup and offered a silver vase as prize. In 1923, the British and Americans had the strongest women players. So, Julian Myrick of the United States Lawn Tennis Association decided that a U.S.-Britain competition would be in order for the Wightman Cup. The event, with Wightman captaining and playing for a winning U.S. side, opened the newly constructed stadium at Forest Hills, New York. A treasured series, it lasted through 1989, disbanding when the event was no longer competitive.

Wightman, devoted to the game in all aspects, generously instructed innumerable players at no charge throughout her life. She also teamed with two of her protégées who later joined her in the International Tennis Hall of Fame to win important titles: Wimbledon, U.S., and Olympic doubles titles with Helen Wills Moody in 1924 and U.S. Indoor women's doubles titles with Sarah Palfrey Cooke from 1928 through 1931. Her second Olympic gold medal in 1924 came in mixed doubles with Dick Williams.

The last of Wightman's record 34 U.S. adult titles was recorded in 1943 as she, 56, and Pauline Betz Addie won the women's doubles title at the U.S. Indoor Championships over Lillian Lopaus and Judy Atterbury, 7–5, 6–1.

Wightman was included in the year-end top 10 rankings issued by the United States Lawn Tennis Association in 1915, 1918, and 1919 and was the top ranked U.S. player in 1919 (rankings began in 1913).

Grand Slam finals

Singles: 5 ( 4 titles, 1 runner-up)

Doubles: 9 (7 titles, 2 runners-up)

Mixed doubles: 8 (6 titles, 2 runners-up)

Grand Slam singles tournament timeline

 R = tournament restricted to French nationals.

*Through 1923, the French Championships were open only to French nationals. The World Hard Court Championships (WHCC), actually played on clay in Paris or Brussels, began in 1912 and were open to all nationalities. The results from that tournament are shown here from 1912 through 1914 and from 1920 through 1923. The Olympics replaced the WHCC in 1924, as the Olympics were held in Paris. Beginning in 1925, the French Championships were open to all nationalities, with the results shown here beginning with that year.

References

Further reading
 Tom Carter and Jim Hotchkiss, First Lady of Tennis: Hazel Hotchkiss Wightman (June 2001), Creative Arts Book Company,

External links
 
 
 
 
 1972 Sports Illustrated Article – The Original Little Old Lady In Tennis Shoes

1886 births
1974 deaths
American female tennis players
Tennis players at the 1924 Summer Olympics
Olympic gold medalists for the United States in tennis
United States National champions (tennis)
People from the San Francisco Bay Area
International Tennis Hall of Fame inductees
University of California, Berkeley alumni
People from Healdsburg, California
Grand Slam (tennis) champions in women's singles
Grand Slam (tennis) champions in women's doubles
Grand Slam (tennis) champions in mixed doubles
Medalists at the 1924 Summer Olympics
Tennis people from California